Academy Glacier is a major Antarctic glacier in the Pensacola Mountains, draining northwestward between the Patuxent and Neptune ranges to enter Foundation Ice Stream.

It was mapped by the USGS from surveys and US Navy air photos in 1956–66, and was named by the US-ACAN for the National Academy of Sciences which played an important role in the planning of the U.S. program in Antarctica.

See also
 List of glaciers in the Antarctic
 Glaciology

References

Glaciers of Queen Elizabeth Land